Carlos Alberto González Fernández (born 30 March 1976) is a Paraguayan footballer, who currently plays for Municipal in Guatemala's top division.

External links

1976 births
Living people
Sportspeople from Asunción
Paraguayan footballers
Paraguayan expatriate footballers
Paraguay international footballers
Segunda División players
Paraguayan Primera División players
Categoría Primera A players
Bolivian Primera División players
UE Lleida players
C.S.D. Municipal players
Cerro Corá footballers
Club Guaraní players
Club Libertad footballers
12 de Octubre Football Club players
Club Nacional footballers
The Strongest players
Deportes Tolima footballers
Atlético Bucaramanga footballers
Expatriate footballers in Guatemala
Expatriate footballers in Spain
Expatriate footballers in Uruguay
Expatriate footballers in Bolivia
Expatriate footballers in Colombia
Paraguayan expatriate sportspeople in Uruguay
Paraguayan expatriate sportspeople in Bolivia
Paraguayan expatriate sportspeople in Colombia
Paraguayan expatriate sportspeople in Spain
Association football midfielders